The 2021 Miami RedHawks football team represented Miami University in the 2021 NCAA Division I FBS football season. They were led by eighth-year head coach Chuck Martin and played their home games at Yager Stadium in Oxford, Ohio, as members of the East Division of the Mid-American Conference.

Previous season

The RedHawks finished the 2020 season 2–1 to finish in a tie for third in the East Division. The 2020 team defeated Ball State and Akron, and lost to Buffalo. The RedHawks had a game scheduled against Arkansas State, but was cancelled due to the COVID-19 pandemic. The team was not invited to a bowl game.

Players drafted into the NFL

Preseason

MAC media day
The Mid-American Conference media day was held on July 20, 2021 at Ford Field in Detroit, Michigan. Miami was represented by head coach Chuck Martin, wide receiver Jack Sorenson and defensive back Mike Brown. The RedHawks were predicted to finish in third place in the East Division in the Mid-American preseason poll.

Schedule

Personnel

Game summaries

at No. 8 Cincinnati

at Minnesota

LIU

at Army

Central Michigan

at Eastern Michigan

Akron

at Ball State

at Ohio

Buffalo

Bowling Green

at Kent State

vs. North Texas (Frisco Football Classic)

References

Miami
Miami RedHawks football seasons
Miami RedHawks football